Ibibio is the native language of the Ibibio people of Nigeria, belonging to the Ibibio-Efik dialect cluster of the Cross River languages. The name Ibibio is sometimes used for the entire dialect cluster. In pre-colonial times, it was written with Nsibidi ideograms, similar to Igbo, Efik, Anaang, and Ejagham. Ibibio has also had influences on Afro-American diasporic languages such as AAVE words like buckra, and buckaroo, which come from the Ibibio word mbakara, and in the Afro-Cuban tradition of abakua.

Geographic distribution
Ibibio is the language of the Ibibio people. The Ibibio people are found in Southeastern Nigeria in Akwa Ibom State, Cross River State, and Eastern Abia State (Arochukwu and Ukwa East LGA's). Ibibio communities in Opobo Nkoro and Oyigbo LGA's of Rivers State are largely unknown.

Some Ibibio are found in other countries (Western Cameroon, Bioko and Ghana).

Phonology

Consonants

  are bilabial, whereas  is labiodental.
  has two allophones, which occur in complementary distribution: voiceless  and voiced .
  are alveolar , whereas  is dental .

Intervocalic plosives are lenited:
  → 
  → 
  →  or

Vowels

  are phonetically near-close .
  are phonetically true-mid;  is also strongly centralized: .
  are phonetically near-open;  is central rather than front: .

Between consonants,  have allophones that are transcribed , respectively. Similarly,  may actually be near-close , rather than close .

In some dialects (e.g.

Tones
Ibibio has five tones: high, mid, rising, falling and low. A word can mean two or more different things based on the tone ascribed to it.

Orthography

References

Bibliography

Further reading

 Bachmann, Arne (2006): "Ein quantitatives Tonmodell für Ibibio. Entwicklung eines Prädiktionsmoduls für das BOSS-Sprachsynthesesystem." Magisterarbeit, University of Bonn.
 Kaufman, Elaine Marlowe (1972) Ibibio dictionary. Leiden: African Studies Centre / Cross River State University / Ibibio Language Board.

External links

 Ibibio kasahorow – language resources, including dictionary, books and proverbs.
 Bachmann's Master Thesis, Paper, Presentation
 BOSS-IBB documentation v0.1-r4
 ELAR Documentation of Dirge songs among the Urban people [Efik, Ibibio]
 ELAR Documentation of documenting drums and drum language in Ibibio traditional ceremonies

Languages of Nigeria
Ibibio
Ibibio-Efik languages